Jinzaburō, Jinzaburo or Jinzaburou (written: 甚三郎 or 仁三郎) is a masculine Japanese given name. Notable people with the name include:

, Japanese general
, Japanese nuclear chemist and writer
Jinzaburo Yonezawa (born 1977), Japanese mixed martial artist

Japanese masculine given names